NCAA GameBreaker 2001 is a video game developed by 989 Sports and published by Sony Computer Entertainment America for the PlayStation and PlayStation 2 in 2000.

Reception

The game received "mixed or average reviews" on both platforms according to the review aggregation website Metacritic. Dan Egger of NextGen said of the PlayStation 2 version, "Football fans would be best served by waiting until next year." (Ironically, the next PlayStation 2 game was not NCAA GameBreaker 2002 but NCAA GameBreaker 2003, which was released two years after this game.)

Notes

References

External links
 

2000 video games
College football video games
NCAA video games
North America-exclusive video games
PlayStation 2 games
PlayStation (console) games
Video games developed in the United States